Dale Allender (born May 23, 1966) is a Black American educator. He is an Associate Professor of language and literacy in the Department of Teaching Credentials at California State University-Sacramento where he teaches courses in Academic Literacy, Ethnic Studies and Racial Social Justice Education. Allender is known for his work on Expanding the Canon, a television series on teaching multicultural literature produced in collaboration with Thirteen/WNET and AnnenbergCPB.

Education
Allender received his Bachelor's in English Education from the University of Wisconsin-Milwaukee in 1994. His Master's Degree, completed in 1997 at the University of Iowa, held an emphasis in Narrative Research, Multicultural Literature, and Critical Race Theory. He received his PhD in Education from the University of Queensland, Australia in 2010 with an emphasis in Multicultural Literature Instruction and Critical Cultural Studies.

Career
Dale began his career as a teacher at Iowa City West High School in Iowa City, Iowa, teaching English and Developmental Reading from 1994 to 1998. Allender's lessons incorporated issues of social justice taught to him by educators who were formerly members of the Black Panther Party and The Young Lords (the Puerto Rican counterpart of the Black Panther Party). This precipitated death threats that garnered national attention because educators and the public wanted to know what he was teaching. Activist and author Ishmael Reed referenced the incident in his book "Another Day At The Front." 

Allender served as the Associate Executive Director for NCTE at their Champaign, Illinois office from 1998 to 2003 and also served as Interim Executive Director. In 2003, he launched NCTE West at the University of California, Berkeley. Allender's work with the Partnership for 21st century Skills on the English Language Arts Literacy Map was the inspiration for a conference which brought together education content area groups: NCTE, NCTM, NCSS, and NSTA. Working with students from Tamalpais High School in Mill Valley, Allender produced a video documenting this conference.

From 2003 to 2013, Allender taught at University of California, Berkeley's College of Education, teaching courses on Language, Literacy, and Culture. During this time, he also taught from 2009 to 2013 in the Secondary Education Department at California State University, San Francisco.

In 2007, Allender was appointed Executive Director of The Bay Area Teachers Center (BATC), a single-subject teacher credential program created as a partnership between San Francisco State University and Lick-Wilmerding High School. Under Allender's leadership, BATC expanded partnerships with the Graduate School of Education at UC Berkeley and Teach Tomorrow Oakland, a project of the Mayor's office and the Oakland United School District.

Awards 

Allender's awards include the Summer Institute for Echoes and Reflections Scholars in Jerusalem Fellowship; the Media award from National Association for Multicultural Education and the Education award from the US International Film and Video Festival for the eight-part professional development television series The Expanding Canon. Allender also received a National Endowment for the Humanities award for the study of American Indian literature. Allender was also awarded an honorary chair at the D.C. area Writers Project 2005 Annual Forum.

Publications 
 Standing on the Border: Issues of Identity and Border Crossing in Young Adult Literature
 The Multicultural Library: An Essay. Multicultural Perspectives
 The Responses of African American Men to Dominant Norms of Masculinity within the United States
 Allender, D. (2001) Literary Guerillas, Canon Keepers, and Empire Institutions: A Black Teacher's Narrative. Ishmael Reed's Konch Magazine

Family 
Allender lives in Sacramento, California with his wife, Fabiola Flores and has three children.

References

External links 
 www.daleallender.com
 https://www.influencewatch.org/person/dale-allender/

Living people
1966 births
University of California, Berkeley Graduate School of Education faculty
Stanford University staff
San Francisco State University faculty
New York University staff
University of California, Los Angeles faculty
Fordham University faculty
Medgar Evers College faculty
University of Queensland alumni
Place of birth missing (living people)